Cristóvão Borges dos Santos (born 9 June 1959) is a Brazilian professional football coach and former player who played as a midfielder.

Playing career
Born in Salvador, Cristóvão played for Fluminense, Atlético Paranaense, Corinthians, Grêmio among other clubs, Cristóvão began his career in Bahia. He won titles with Fluminense, Atlético-PR and Grêmio.

Cristóvão retired in 1994, after representing Rio Branco-SP. At international level, he represented Brazil on seven occasions during the 1989 season, scoring three goals and helping in their Copa América winning campaign.

Coaching career
Cristóvão began working as an assistant coach four years after retiring, with his first experience being on Bangu in 1998. In the following year, he joined Ricardo Gomes' staff at Sport Recife, and subsequently worked with Gomes for nearly ten years. Both part ways in 2005, when Gomes was appointed head coach of FC Girondins de Bordeaux; Cristóvão later worked with Toninho Cerezo at Al Shabab.

In February 2011, Cristóvão rejoined Gomes' staff, being appointed assistant coach at Vasco da Gama. In August, as Gomes suffered a stroke and had to step aside from his activities, Cristóvão took over as head coach and guided Vasco to the Copa Sudamericana semifinals and the 2nd place on the 2011 Brazilian League. He was sacked on 10 September of the following year, after a 4–0 loss against Bahia.

On 17 May 2013, Cristóvão was appointed head coach of Bahia, still in the top tier. On 9 December, after avoiding relegation, he left the club on mutual agreement.

Cristóvão also managed other teams such as Fluminense, Flamengo and Atlético Paranaense. On 19 June 2016, he was announced as Corinthians' new head coach, after Tite left the club to manage the Brazil national team, but was relieved from his duties on 17 September, with less than three months in charge.

On 29 November 2016, Cristóvão returned to Vasco after being appointed head coach for the ensuing season. He was dismissed the following 17 March, and remained unemployed for nearly three years before taking over Atlético Goianiense on 20 January 2020.

Cristóvão was sacked by Atlético on 25 February 2020, after just seven matches. On 17 November 2022, after nearly two years without coaching, he was appointed in charge of Figueirense, but was sacked the following 19 March.

Honours

Player

Club
Bahia
 Campeonato Baiano: 1977, 1978

Fluminense
 Campeonato Carioca: 1980

Atlético Paranaense
 Campeonato Paranaense: 1983, 1985

Grêmio
 Campeonato Gaúcho: 1987, 1988, 1989
 Copa do Brasil: 1989

International
Brazil
 Copa América: 1989

References

External links

1959 births
Living people
Brazilian footballers
Brazilian football managers
Brazil international footballers
1989 Copa América players
Copa América-winning players
Campeonato Brasileiro Série A players
Campeonato Brasileiro Série A managers
Esporte Clube Bahia players
Fluminense FC players
Operário Futebol Clube (MS) players
Club Athletico Paranaense players
Santa Cruz Futebol Clube players
Sport Club Corinthians Paulista players
Grêmio Foot-Ball Porto Alegrense players
Guarani FC players
Associação Portuguesa de Desportos players
Clube Atlético Mineiro players
Rio Branco Esporte Clube players
CR Vasco da Gama managers
Esporte Clube Bahia managers
Fluminense FC managers
CR Flamengo managers
Club Athletico Paranaense managers
Sport Club Corinthians Paulista managers
Atlético Clube Goianiense managers
Pan American Games gold medalists for Brazil
Association football midfielders
Pan American Games medalists in football
Footballers at the 1979 Pan American Games
Medalists at the 1979 Pan American Games
Sportspeople from Salvador, Bahia
Figueirense FC managers